Augusto Ibáñez Guzmán (1958 – 11 July 2018) was a Colombian lawyer and academic. He was the President of the Supreme Court of Justice of Colombia from 2009–2012.

Early life 
Ibáñez was born in Tunja, capital of the Colombian department of Boyacá,  in 1958. His father, Joaquín T. Ibáñez Alarcón, was a surgeon and his mother, Elvira Guzmán de Ibáñez, was a senior nurse. He was the youngest of four brothers.

Career 
Ibáñez studied law at the Universidad Externado de Colombia, and was a founder of the University's Centre for Jurisprudence Studies. He worked as a specialist in criminal law at the University of Salamanca in Spain, and the Universidad Externado de Colombia in Bogotá. Ibáñez also worked as a minister in the International Criminal Court from 1999–2001, during which time he signed the Rome Statute of the International Criminal Court. As a judge, Ibáñez worked for the Superior Court of Bogotá from 2007–2012, where he was President from 2009–2012. Whilst President of the Supreme Court, he distanced himself from then Colombian president Álvaro Uribe. Days after bring appointed as President of the Supreme Court, Ibáñez complained to Uribe about the Administrative Department of Security's illegal interference with the Supreme Court. Ibáñez was also an advisor to the House of Representatives. He was the judge that convicted members of the Army after the 1996 La Gabarra massacre.

In 2008, Ibáñez claimed that a dozen armed men stormed his house to steal his personal computer, as it contained important information relating to his work. In 2010, he asked for government protection after being threatened. In 2017, Ibáñez received a PhD from Alfonso X El Sabio University. His thesis was on peace agreements.

Death 
In 2016, Ibáñez was diagnosed with liver cancer. He died on 11 July 2018 in a hospital in Bogotá, and his funeral was held in the Cristo Rey parish in Bogotá.

References 

1958 births
2018 deaths
Colombian politicians
20th-century Colombian lawyers
21st-century Colombian judges
Magistrates of the Supreme Court of Justice of Colombia
Presidents of the Supreme Court of Justice of Colombia
Universidad Externado de Colombia alumni
Academic staff of the University of Salamanca
People from Tunja
Deaths from liver cancer
Deaths from cancer in Colombia
Academic staff of Universidad Externado de Colombia
Alfonso X El Sabio University alumni